The Towle TA-2 was an amphibious aircraft based on the T owle WC built for a 1929 round-the world flight.

Development
Thomas Towle was an engineer that had been involved with many early aircraft designs. Having just co-designed the Eastman E-2 Sea Rover and the Towle WC, Towle found funding to create a new entity, the Towle Aircraft Company to produce the TA-2.

Design
The TA-2 featured an corrugated aluminum hull. The wings were all metal with internal stiffeners, rather than ribs, based loosely on the Ford Trimotor, which Towle worked on previously. The twin Wright R-540 engines sat on small pylons on top of the shoulder mounted wing. Two floats were mounted directly below the engine pylons which incorporated the hydraulically actuated landing gear. The prototype was originally designed for 165 hp Wright 540 engines.

Operational history
The TA-2 was tested in Lake St. Clair on 7 November 1929 by test pilot George Pond and James Bradley. It broke up on takeoff and sank to the bottom of the lake. The aircraft appears to have been rebuilt as a Towle TA-2 and was reported to have visited Lympne Airport, Kent, United Kingdom in February 1930. The wing from the prototype was salvaged and used on the next iteration, the Towle TA-3.

Variants
 Towle WC The basis for the TA-2

Specifications

See also

References

Amphibious aircraft